Carey Wayland Henderson (1844-1880) was a mayor of Bloomington, Indiana at the age of 32 years old. He served from 1876 to 1878. He was also a member of the Knights of Pythias. He was born in Putnamville, Indiana.

By occupation he was an attorney and a law clerk for the Post Office Department in Washington DC in 1880. He also served as a clerk in his younger years with the Indiana Legislature. Henderson was a graduate of Indiana University and is listed as a freshman in 1862. He died at the age of 36 not long after his arrival in Washington DC in 1880, ending a career in politics and public service. He is buried in Rose Hill Cemetery.

Mayors of Bloomington, Indiana
1844 births
1880 deaths